The Heidelberg Disputation was held at the lecture hall of the Augustinian order on April 26, 1518.  It was here that Martin Luther, as a delegate for his order, began to have occasion to articulate his views. In the defense of his theses, which culminated in a contrast between divine love and human love, Luther defended the doctrine of human depravity and the bondage of the will. Martin Bucer, the reformer of Strasbourg, heard Luther here and became an avid follower.  This disputation also led to Johann Eck's challenging Martin Luther to the Leipzig Debate.

28 theses
The Heidelberg 28 theses were the basis of the disputation and represented a significant evolution from the 95 theses of the previous year from a simple dispute about the theology behind indulgences to a fuller, Augustinian theology of sovereign grace.

Observers

See also
 Theology of the Cross

References

Resources
 .
 .
 .
 .

External links
 .

Heildelberg
Martin Luther
1518 in Christianity